Patharquerry is a locality in Guwahati, surrounded by Lokhra and Barsapara localities.
Situated in northeastern part of the city, this area is residential with a small commercial infrastructure.

Transport
Locality is well connected to rest of the city with city buses and other modes of transportation.

See also
 Paltan Bazaar
 Rehabari

References

Neighbourhoods in Guwahati